The Marriage Business is a 1927 British silent comedy film directed by Leslie S. Hiscott and starring Estelle Brody, Owen Nares and Jack Rutherford. It is also known by the alternative title This Woman Business.

Cast
 Estelle Brody as Annette
 Owen Nares as Robert
 Marjorie Hume as Pat
 Jack Rutherford as Duncan
 Jeff Barlow as Perkins
 Polly Ward as Maid

References

Bibliography
 Low, Rachael. History of the British Film, 1918-1929. George Allen & Unwin, 1971.

External links
 

1927 films
1927 comedy films
British comedy films
British silent feature films
Films directed by Leslie S. Hiscott
British black-and-white films
1920s English-language films
1920s British films
Silent comedy films